Hudyma, also transliterated Gudyma or Gudima, is a Ukrainian surname. Notable people with the surname include:

Borys Hudyma (born 1941), Ukrainian diplomat and politician
Lindsay Hudyma (born 1986), Canadian curler
Olesya Hudyma (born 1980), Ukrainian painter
Volodymyr Hudyma (born 1990), Ukrainian footballer
Tamara Gudima (1936–2021), Russian politician

See also
 

Ukrainian-language surnames